Chevenard is a French surname. Notable people with the surname include:

 Claude-Aimé Chenavard  (1797–1838), French artist
 Pierre Chevenard (1888–1960), French metallurgist

See also
 Paul Chenavard (1808–1895), French painter

French-language surnames